Ellis Gallagher is an artist and painter known primarily for street drawings made by working with different sources of light and shadows and chalk on the streets of New York City, as well as other international destinations. Gallagher was born in Manhattan's East Village. Before his street drawings, he was a graffiti writer, working in the streets as well as the studio. Gallagher started his street drawings in early 2005, the first drawing being an outline of a fire hydrant. He continues to make art in public and private, via paintings, drawings, in-situ sculptures and site-specific installations, as well as street art and public art, in 2022.

Career 

Gallagher's chalk work are outlines of objects on the street and often outline simple solid shadows, typically his bicycle setup in front of an existing light source. Works have lasted as long as a month.

Gallagher was once arrested for drawing and signing his name in chalk. Charges were dropped, but he spent 17 hours in jail for which he sued the city, claiming false arrest and unlawful imprisonment. Paul Hale, Gallagher's lawyer, claims using chalk on the sidewalk is legal.

Ellis Gallagher is a native New Yorker. As a former graffiti writer, his work can be found in New York City and beyond, in Autograf: New York City's Graffiti Writers by Peter Sutherland (Powerhouse Books), in The Street Art Book: 60 Artists In Their Own Words by Ric Blackshaw and Liz Farrelly (Collins Design), also in the art textbook Making Art Connections: Visual Arts years 7 and 8 (McGraw-Hill Education), as well as in numerous newspapers, magazines, on television and in films. Gallagher's work has also appeared in numerous publications and features.

References

External links
 http://nymag.com/daily/intel/2007/10/ellis_gallagher_will_make_all.html 
 http://www.nydailynews.com/boroughs/brooklyn/2007/10/19/2007-10-19_artist_vows_to_keep_chalking_even_after_.html 
 http://www.nydailynews.com/news/crime_file/2007/10/25/2007-10-25_cops_put_artist_thru_perp_chalk__again.html 
 http://www.thirteen.org/nyvoices/realpop/realpop_hi.php?name=shadows 
 http://www.artnet.com/magazineus/reviews/davis/davis12-21-07.asp 
 Brooklyn Museum. Recording of interview with audience at Brooklyn Museum exhibition.   
 Personal Conversation with the artist, 2008.
 Mulcahyn, Conrad. "Tracing Shadows" New York Times, December 10, 2005.
 Tucker, Maria Luisa. "Drawn and Quartered: Sidewalk Chalk Artist Fights NYPD Harassment" Village Voice, January 22, 2008.

Living people
American graffiti artists
Artists from New York City
1973 births